The final of the Women's 400 metres Hurdles event at the 2003 Pan American Games took place on Wednesday August 6, 2003, with the heats staged a day earlier. America's Joanna Hayes was the only woman to go under the 55-seconds barrier, clocking 54.77 in the final.

Medalists

Records

Results

See also
2003 World Championships in Athletics – Women's 400 metres hurdles
Athletics at the 2004 Summer Olympics – Women's 400 metre hurdles

Notes

References
Results

Hurdles, Women's 400
2003
2003 in women's athletics